Dambach may refer to:

Places
 Dambach, Bas-Rhin, France
 Dambach Colonia, a neighborhood of Managua, Nicaragua
 Dambach-la-Ville, Bas-Rhin, France
 Dambach, Germany, a municipality in Landkreis Birkenfeld, Rhineland-Palatinate

People with the surname
Erica Dambach (born 1975), American women's soccer player and coach